, Plants of the World Online (PoWO) accepted 150 genera in the family Rutaceae. The Angiosperm Phylogeny Website (APweb) also accepted about 150 genera, but with some genera accepted by PoWO not accepted and some extra genera. About 140 genera were common to the two lists. The list below is based on PoWO, with placements in APWeb shown in parentheses.

A

Acmadenia Bartl. & H.L.Wendl.
Acradenia Kippist
Acronychia J.R.Forst. & G.Forst. - lemon aspen
Adenandra Willd.
Adiscanthus Ducke
Aegle Corrêa - bael
Aeglopsis Swingle
Afraegle Engl.
Afraurantium A.Chev.
Agathosma Willd.
Amyris P.Browne - West Indian sandalwood
Andreadoxa Kallunki
Angostura Roem. & Schult.
Apocaulon R.S.Cowan
Asterolasia F.Muell.
Atalantia Corrêa

B

Balfourodendron Mello ex Oliv.
Balsamocitrus Stapf
Boenninghausenia Rchb. ex Meisn.
Boronia Sm.
Bosistoa F.Muell. ex Benth. - bonewoods
Bottegoa Chiov.
Bouchardatia Baill.
Bouzetia Montrouz.
Brombya F.Muell.
Burkillanthus Swingle

C 

Calodendrum Thunb.
Casimiroa La Llave
Cedrelopsis Baill.
Chloroxylon DC.
Choisya Kunth - Mexican orange
Chorilaena Endl.
Citropsis (Engl.) Swingle & M.Kellerm. - African orange cherry
Citrus L.
Clausena Burm.f.
Clymenia Swingle (may be included in Citrus)
Cneoridium Hook.f.
Cneorum L. (formerly in Cneoraceae)
Coleonema Bartl. & H.L.Wendl. - breath of heaven
Comptonella Baker f. (may be included in Melicope)
Conchocarpus J.C.Mikan
Correa Andrews
Crossosperma T.G.Hartley
Crowea Sm.
Cyanothamnus Lindl.

D

Decagonocarpus Engl.
Decatropis Hook.f.
Decazyx Pittier & S.F.Blake
Dendrosma Pancher & Sebert, synonym of Geijera
Desmotes Kallunki
Dictamnus L. - burning-bush
Dictyoloma A.Juss.
Diphasia Pierre, synonym of Vepris
Dinosperma T.G.Hartley
Diosma L.
Diplolaena R.Br.
Drummondita Harv.
Dutailliopsis T.G.Hartley
Dutaillyea Baill. (may be included in Melicope)

E

Empleurum Aiton
Eriostemon Sm.
Ertela 
Erythrochiton Nees & Mart.
Esenbeckia Kunth
Euchaetis Bartl. & H.L.Wendl.
Euodia J.R.Forst. & G.Forst.
Euxylophora Huber

F
Fagaropsis Mildbr. – crow ash, cudgerie
Flindersia R.Br.

G
Galipea Aubl.
Geijera Schott - wilga, axebreakers
Geleznowia Turcz.
Glycosmis Corrêa

H
Halfordia F.Muell.
Haplophyllum A.Juss.
Harrisonia R.Br. ex A.Juss.
Helietta Tul.
Hortia Vand.

I
Ivodea Capuron

L
Leionema (F.Muell.) Paul G.Wilson
Leptothyrsa Hook.f.
Limnocitrus Swingle, synonym of Pleiospermium
Limonia L.
Lubaria Pittier
Lunasia Blanco
Luvunga Buch.-Ham. ex Wight & Arn.

M

Maclurodendron T.G.Hartley (may be included in Acronychia)
Macrostylis Bartl. & H.L.Wendl.
Medicosma Hook.f.
Megastigma Hook.f.
Melicope J.R.Forst. & G.Forst. - corkwood, alani
Merope M.Roem.
Merrillia Swingle, synonym of Murraya
Metrodorea A.St.-Hil.
Microcybe Turcz.
Micromelum Blume
Monanthocitrus Tanaka
Muiriantha C.A.Gardner
Murraya J.Koenig ex L.
Myrtopsis Engl.

N
Naringi Adans.
Naudinia Planch. & Linden
Nematolepis Turcz.
Neobyrnesia J.A.Armstr.
Neoraputia Emmerich ex Kallunki
Neoschmidia T.G.Hartley

O
Oricia Pierre, synonym of Vepris
Oriciopsis Engl., synonym of Vepris
Orixa Thunb.
Oxanthera Montrouz., synonym of Citrus

P

Pamburus Swingle
Paramignya Wight
Peltostigma Walp.
Pentaceras Hook.f.
Perryodendron T.G.Hartley
Phebalium Vent.
Phellodendron Rupr. - cork-tree
Philotheca Rudge
Phyllosma Bolus ex Schltr.
Picrella Baill. (may be included in Melicope)
Pilocarpus Vahl
Pitavia Molina
Pitaviaster T.G.Hartley (may be included in Melicope)
Platydesma H.Mann, synonym of Melicope
Pleiospermium Swingle
Plethadenia Urb.
Polyaster Hook.f.
Psilopeganum Hemsl.
Ptaeroxylon Eckl. & Zeyh. - sneezewood tree
Ptelea L.

R

Raputia Aubl.
Raputiarana Emmerich
Rauia Nees & Mart.
Raulinoa R.S.Cowan
Ravenia Vell.
Raveniopsis Gleason
Rhadinothamnus Paul G.Wilson
Ruta L.
Rutaneblina Steyerm. & Luteyn

S
Sarcomelicope Engl. (may be included in Melicope)
Severinia Ten., synonym of Atalantia
Sheilanthera I.Williams
Sigmatanthus Huber ex Emmerich
Skimmia Thunb.
Sohnreyia K.Krause
Spathelia L.
Spiranthera A.St.-Hil.
Stauranthus Liebm.
Swinglea Merr.

T

Teclea Delile, synonym of Vepris
Tetractomia Hook.f.
Tetradium Lour.
Thamnosma Torr. & Frém.
Ticorea Aubl.
Toddalia Juss., synonym of Zanthoxylum
Toxosiphon Baill.
Triphasia Lour.

V
Vepris Comm. ex A.Juss.

W
Wenzelia Merr.

Z
Zanthoxylum L.  - toothache tree
Zieria Sm. (may be included in Boronia)

References 

 
Rutaceae